In Hawaiian mythology, Nuakea is a beneficent goddess of milk and lactation.

This name was also a title for a wet nurse of royal prince, according to David Malo.

Nuakea was appealed to staunch the flow of milk in the mother's breasts.

Euhemerism 
There was a chiefess named after the goddess—Nuʻakea, wife of Keʻoloʻewa, chief of Molokai.

Martha Warren Beckwith suggested that Nuʻakea was deified.

According to the myth, Nuʻakea was a goddess who came to Earth and married mortal chief Keʻoloʻewa, but it is known that historical Nuʻakea was born on Oahu.

Notes 

Hawaiian goddesses
Milk
Wet nursing